Layton station is a FrontRunner commuter rail station in Layton, Utah. It is operated by the Utah Transit Authority (UTA).

Description
The station is located at 150 South Main Street (SR-126) on approximately 12.5 acres of land and is easily accessed from I-15 by way of the new Layton Parkway interchange. The station is near the south end of Layton's historic downtown area, which had suffered from a hard-to-access location in a highly acute wedge bounded by I-15 on the northeast and the railroad tracks on the southwest. The railroad tracks have also presented enough of a barrier that the area west of the station and the tracks is still undeveloped despite its proximity to the historic downtown. Besides the station's opening on the site of the previous Union Pacific Layton Depot, access in the area has also recently been improved (both from I-15 and from surrounding parts of Layton) by the completion of the new Layton Parkway interchange on I-15, which is just south of the station.

The station has two free Park and Ride lots with about 380 total parking spaces available. However, a majority of these parking spaces are in the lot that is located just off South Main Street about one block north of the station.  This lot can be accessed by either South Main Street or by a path that parallels the tracks and connects the north end of the platform with the parking lot. The station is located within the Quiet Zone, so trains do not routinely sound their horns when approaching public crossings within this corridor. The inaugural FrontRunner train departed the station southbound at 9:45 am April 26, 2008.

References

External links 
Layton Station Quick Facts

Railway stations in the United States opened in 2008
UTA FrontRunner stations
Transportation in Davis County, Utah
2008 establishments in Utah
Railway stations in Davis County, Utah